Peter Tom Wolfenden  (24 January 1935 – 18 February 2023) was a New Zealand driver and trainer of Standardbred racehorses. He is most notable for his victory in the New Zealand Trotting Cup when he drove New Zealand's top pacer Cardigan Bay. He won the New Zealand drivers' premiership 14 times, including eight consecutive years from 1974, and twice won the Australasian Drivers Championship. He represented New Zealand seven times in the World Drivers Championship in harness racing, placing second in 1977 and third in 1971.  He had 1762 career race wins in New Zealand as a driver, and 798 as a trainer.

In the 1982 New Year Honours, Wolfenden was appointed a Member of the Order of the British Empire (MBE), for services to trotting. He was inducted into the New Zealand Sports Hall of Fame.

Wolfenden died on 18 February 2023, at the age of 88.

Big race wins
Peter Wolfenden's career included driving the following winners:

 1984 Auckland Cup – Enterprise
 1983 Auckland Cup – Armalight
 1980 Rowe Cup – Special Pride
 1979 Inter Dominion Pacing Championship – Rondel
 1978 Auckland Cup – Sole Command
 1977 Rowe Cup – Framalda
 1987 New Zealand Trotting Derby – Motu Prince
 1977 New Zealand Trotting Cup – Sole Command
 1974 Great Northern Derby – Captain Harcourt 
 1970 New Zealand Trotting Cup – James
 1969 Rowe Cup – Special Cash
 1968 Rowe Cup – Special Cash
 1966 Great Northern Derby – Governor Frost
 1965 New Zealand Trotting Cup – Garry Dillon
 1963 Auckland Cup – Cardigan Bay
 1963 Inter Dominion Pacing Championship – Cardigan Bay
 1963 New Zealand Free For All – Cardigan Bay
 1963 New Zealand Trotting Cup- Cardigan Bay
 1961 Auckland Cup – Cardigan Bay
 1961 Great Northern Derby – Waitaki Hanover 
 1961 New Zealand Free For All – Cardigan Bay
 1960 Auckland Cup – Damian
 1960 Rowe Cup – Jewel Derby

See also
 Harness racing in New Zealand

References

1935 births
2023 deaths
New Zealand harness racers
New Zealand Members of the Order of the British Empire